is a passenger railway station located in the town of Mannō, Nakatado District, Kagawa Prefecture, Japan. It is operated by JR Shikoku and has the station number "D16".

Lines

Layout
The station, which is unstaffed, consists of two side platforms serving two tracks. A building adjacent to one platform serves as a passenger waiting room. An overhead foot bridge leads to the other platform but this platform may also be entered from its own access road. Parking and a bike shed are provided.

Adjacent stations

History
With the privatization of JNR on 1 April 1987, control of the station passed to JR Shikoku.

Surrounding area
Mannou Town Nakaminami Branch
Mannou Municipal Nakaminami Elementary School

See also
 List of Railway Stations in Japan

References

External links

JR Shikoku timetable 

Railway stations in Kagawa Prefecture
Railway stations in Japan opened in 1923
Mannō, Kagawa